Constellation Records was an American record label extant from 1963 to 1966. Despite only being in business for a few years, the label was described by the Encyclopedia of Popular Music as "one of the legendary labels of the soul era".

Constellation was founded by Ewart Abner in 1963 after he was forced from Vee-Jay Records. His business partners included artist and repertory man Bunky Sheppard and investor Art Sheridan. The label's most successful artist was Gene Chandler. While it was a prominent releaser of Chicago soul music, it also released many singles from New Orleans-based musicians, as well as music in the genres of rock, pop, gospel, and blues.

Constellation released approximately 70 singles during its time of operation, many of which were re-released on CD by Collectables Records in later decades.

Artists

Gene Chandler
Billy "The Kid" Emerson
Nolan Chance
Dee Clark
Lee Dorsey
Frankie Ford
The Freedoms
Wilbert Harrison
Sonny Holliday
Sandra Lynn
Johnny Lytle
Holly Maxwell
Bobby Miller
Roscoe Robinson
The Sheppard
Gerri Taylor
Carol Vega
Don Jacoby

References

American record labels